The following is the list of World Series of Poker Main Event champions. The World Series of Poker (WSOP) is "the oldest, largest, most prestigious, and most media-hyped gaming competition in the world".  It is held annually since 1970 in Las Vegas.  Since 1972, the Main Event of the WSOP has been the $10,000 buy-in no-limit Texas Hold 'Em tournament. The winner of the WSOP Main Event receives a World Series of Poker bracelet, millions of dollars (with the exact amount based on the number of entrants), and the right to be considered the year's World Champion of Poker.  From 2008 to 2016, the nine players who made it to the final table of the Main Event were called the November Nine, a reference to the fact that the final table was completed in November, months after the Main Event's preliminary rounds were completed.

Until 2005, the WSOP was held at Binion's Horseshoe.  In 2005, the event moved to the Rio All Suite Hotel and Casino.  The 2005 Main Event was not played completely at the Rio.  The final three tables, which comprised the final 27 players, played the conclusion of the event at Binion's Horseshoe.  All of the Main Events that followed the 2005 event were played completely at the Rio.  Consequently, this made Joe Hachem the final player to win the Main Event at the original home of the World Series of Poker.

Milestones
Johnny Moss was the first person to win the WSOP.  Since then only Moss and Stu Ungar have won the Main Event three times; Ungar is the only one to have won three times in the freeze-out format. Moss, Ungar, Doyle Brunson and Johnny Chan are the only people who have won the Main Event two years in a row.  Johnny Chan's second victory in 1988 was featured on the 1998 film Rounders. Peter Eastgate was the youngest person to win the Main Event when he won it in 2008, at 22 years of age.  He held that record for one year, when 21-year-old Joe Cada became the youngest Main Event champion.

World Series of Poker Main Event

Worlds Series of Poker Europe Main Event
The World Series of Poker Europe (WSOPE) is the first expansion effort of World Series of Poker-branded poker tournaments outside the United States. Since 1970, the bracelet events have occurred every year in Las Vegas.  The inaugural WSOPE, held in 2007, marked the first time that a WSOP bracelet was awarded outside Las Vegas.  The 2007 Main Event, a GBP 10,000 buy-in no-limit hold 'em tournament, was won by Norwegian player Annette Obrestad on the day before her 19th birthday. This made her the youngest person to win a WSOP bracelet, a record that cannot be broken in the Las Vegas WSOP under current laws because the minimum legal age for casino gaming in Nevada is 21. Obrestad could play in the WSOPE because the minimum age for casino gaming in the United Kingdom is 18.  The World Series of Poker Europe has a unique identity from the Las Vegas WSOP, but according to Harrah's will remain true to the traditions and heritage. The 2011 WSOP Europe main event was an 8-handed event.

World Series of Poker Asia Pacific Main Event
The World Series of Poker Asia Pacific (WSOP APAC) is the most recent expansion of World Series of Poker-branded tournaments outside the United States. On April 30, 2012, WSOP owner Caesars Entertainment and Australian casino Crown Melbourne announced that the first WSOP APAC would be launched with five bracelet events in April 2013.

World Series of Poker Online Main Event

Due to the COVID-19 pandemic, in 2020 the World Series of Poker held an online poker series.

Notes

References

World Series of Poker
World Series of Poker Main Event champions
Poker